Many literary awards give significant remunerations. This is a list of active literary awards from around the world with a prize of at least  or equivalent. Although global in scope and comprising over 35 awards, most of the prizes are in only four currencies: United Arab Emirates dirham, Swedish krona, Euro, and United States dollar.

Inclusion criteria 
The award is active and is primarily focused on writing (novels, poetry, non-fiction etc..)
The remuneration is equal to or greater than US$100,000 or equivalent. Because fluctuating exchange rates move non-US dollar denominated awards in and out of the list over time, awards near this amount are also included.
The award is for any genre of writing (fiction, journalism, etc.) or award type (book or author).
The listed remuneration is for a single winner or co-winners. The list does not aggregate the total value of runners-up and other prizes within the same award. For example, the Prime Minister's Literary Awards is listed as A$100,000 even though it is composed of four prizes totalling A$400,000.

Prizes 

Key
Columns are sortable (click small square)
Type: Book: Award is for a book title / Author: Award is for an author name
() Award is not literary-specific but has some literary winners.
This list is incomplete; you can help by expanding it.

The following awards have a superlative claim within certain defined categories, as described and sourced in the Notes column.

References 

Literature records
Literature lists
richest
Literary prizes
Literary prizes